Abdolreza Jamilian is an Iranian orthodontist and a USPTO patent holder for devices including a method and system for treatment of maxillary deficiency using miniscrews, a tongue plat, and an R-appliance.

Biography and education 
Abdolreza Jamilian was born in Arak in 1965. He received his doctor of dental surgery degree (D.D.S.) from Shahid Beheshti University of medical sciences in 1991 and orthodontics degree in 1998. He also received his fellowship of orthognathic surgery and craniofacial syndromes from the same university in 2011.

Jamilian is a member of the Iranian and European Board of Orthodontics, and known for his innovations in designing therapeutic modalities for class III malocclusion patients.

Innovative treatment
Class III malocclusion is considered to be one of the most difficult and complex orthodontic problems to treat for 12 year old patients or younger. This malocclusion is characterized by mandibular prognathism, maxillary deficiency or both. In subjects with maxillary deficiency where the mandible is not markedly affected treatment may involve stimulation and guidance of maxillary growth by orthopedic forces. Various types of orthodontic headgear, such as facemasks and reverse pull headgears have been used to correct maxillary deficiency; however, these extra-oral appliances have some unpleasant side-effects including the fear of being mocked by one's peers due to the bulky size of these appliances and causing downward and backward rotations of mandible which pulls the upper jaw backwards into the airway of a growing child.

In the method invented by Jamilian, maxillary deficiency is corrected with the help of self-drilling titanium alloy miniscrews and class III elastics. Miniscrews are much smaller than bulky facemasks and this may increase patient's compliance.

The method is not researched in vitro or in vivo, by Dr. Jamilian or any independent researchers. The efficiency of this proposed method is not verified yet.

Honors and awards
Distinguished Researcher Award, Islamic Azad University, 2008 
Distinguished Researcher Award, Islamic Azad University, 2011
Distinguished Researcher Award, Islamic Azad University, 2013

Memberships
World Federation of Orthodontists
America Association of Orthodontists
European Orthodontic Society
Iranian Association of Orthodontists

References

External links

21st-century Iranian inventors
Iranian dentists
Living people
1965 births